Melaleuca strobophylla is a shrub or small tree in the myrtle family Myrtaceae and is endemic to the south-west of Western Australia. It has papery bark, sharply pointed, twisted leaves and rather long spikes of creamy white flowers in summer.

Description

The creamy-white flowers are arranged in spikes at the ends of branches which continue to grow after flowering and sometimes also in the upper leaf axils. The stamens are arranged in bundles of five around the flower, with 16 to 27 stamens in each bundle.

Taxonomy and naming
Melaleuca strobophylla was first formally described in 1988 by Bryan Alwyn Barlow in Australian Systematic Botany from a specimen located near Ravensthorpe. The specific epithet (strobophylla) is from the Ancient Greek words strobos meaning "twisting" or "turning" and phyllon meaning “leaf” referring to the twist in the leaves.

Distribution and habitat
This melaleuca occurs in and between the Eneabba, Three Springs and Yalgoo districts.
It is found on sandy silt soils in depressions, watercourses and the margins of salt lakes.

Conservation
Melaleuca strobophylla is classified as "not threatened" by the Government of Western Australia Department of Parks and Wildlife.

Use in horticulture
This is a useful species for growing in heavier, saline soils in drier, winter rainfall areas.

References

strobophylla
Myrtales of Australia
Plants described in 1988
Endemic flora of Western Australia